Imdad Ali Imam Ali Kazi (18 April 1886 – 13 April 1968), also known as Imdad Ali Kazi, the son of Kazi Imam Ali Ansari, was a scholar, philosopher, jurist, and educationist.  He is considered to be a founding father of the University of Sindh at its present location at Jamshoro. He published works of Sindhi art, literature, mysticism, education and history. Along with his wife Elsa, he wrote a book on comparative religion, The Adventures of the Brown Girl in her Search for God, which was published by Arthur H Stockwell Ltd., England, in 1933. They also worked on a translation of the verses of Shah Abdul Latif Bhittai.

Education and early life
Imdad Ali Kazi was the second son of the second wife of Kazi Imam Ali Ansari, the District Magistrate of Hyderabad, and was born on 18 April 1886, at Hyderabad. His family was originally from Paat of Dadu District. He studied the Quran, Persian language, Arabic, Sindhi language and Urdu language from a private tutor.

I.I. Kazi went to London in 1907 for higher education, where he studied Economics at the London School of Economics. In 1910, he married a German woman, Elsa, who was thereafter called Elsa Kazi. Elsa Kazi was also well-versed in literature. In 1911, Kazi received the degree of Bar-at-Law, after which he returned home to Hyderabad with his wife.

Imdad Ali Kazi studied Arabic in Cairo in 1932. Next year in 1933, he further studied Arabic at the London School of Oriental and African Studies.

While he was studying in England, he was a contemporary of Allama Iqbal and Muhammad Ali Jinnah.

Career
The British offered the young barrister the post of Civil Judge of Tando Muhammad Khan. He also served as the district and sessions judge of Khairpur during the British rule.

Allama I.I. Kazi served as Vice-Chancellor of University of Sindh from 1951 to 1958.

Death and legacy
I.I. Kazi died on 13 April 1968 in Hyderabad, Pakistan at age 81. He was buried at the campus of University of Sindh at Jamshoro.
Several books and articles have been written on the life of Kazi and tributes paid to him annually on the anniversary of his death

Many well-known scholars like Maulana Abul Kalam Azad, Allama Iqbal, Maulana Ubaidullah Sindhi and George Bernard Shaw were deeply impressed by his writings.

References

1886 births
1968 deaths
Sindhi people
Alumni of the London School of Economics
Pakistani Sindhologists
20th-century Pakistani historians
Pakistani judges
Vice-Chancellors of the University of Sindh
Scholars from Sindh